According to UniProt, Zena's brush-furred rat (Lophuromys zena) is a species of rat. However, the IUCN lists this as a synonym for Lophuromys flavopunctatus (yellow-spotted brush-furred rat).

References 

Endemic fauna of Kenya
Lophuromys
Mammals described in 1909